The Orillia Kings are Junior "B" box lacrosse team from Orillia, Ontario, Canada. The Kings play in the OLA Junior B Lacrosse League.

History
Orillia Lions 1973 - 1988
Orillia Kings 1990 - 1997
Orillia Rama Kings 1998 - 2008
Orillia Kings 2009 - Present

Season-by-season results
Note: GP = Games played, W = Wins, L = Losses, T = Ties, Pts = Points, GF = Goals for, GA = Goals against

External links
Kings Webpage
The Bible of Lacrosse
Unofficial OLA Page

Ontario Lacrosse Association teams
Sport in Orillia